Robert Rosen may refer to:
Robert Ross (entrepreneur) (Robert Rosen, 1918–2011), founder of one medical school in Dominica and another in St. Kitts
Robert Rosen (photographer), Australian photographer
Robert Rosen (theoretical biologist) (1934–1998), American theoretical biologist
Robert Rosen (writer) (born 1952), American author
Robert Ozn (Robert M. Rosen, born 1964), American producer, screenwriter, and entertainer
Robert Rosén (born 1987), Swedish ice hockey player

See also 
 Robert Rose (disambiguation)
 Bert Rose (1919–2001), football executive
 Robert Rossen (1908–1966), American screenwriter, film director, and producer